Charles Garrod (born 6 April 1947) is a New Zealand cricketer. He played in four first-class matches for Central Districts in 1966/67.

See also
 List of Central Districts representative cricketers

References

External links
 

1947 births
Living people
New Zealand cricketers
Central Districts cricketers
Cricketers from Blenheim, New Zealand